Eric M. Hammel (June 29, 1946 – August 25, 2020) was a military historian, with a focus on the military campaigns of the
United States Marine Corps in the Pacific War, and other military action in World War II as well as military conflicts including the Vietnam War and the Arab-Israeli Conflict.  Hammel wrote a series of books about World War II Flying Aces but his most influential book was The Root : The Marines in Beirut, August 1982-February 1984 on the subject of the 1983 Beirut barracks bombings.

Hammel worked in several occupations before he settled on writing and publishing.  He was formerly a stringer and contributing editor to Leatherneck Magazine.  He owned and operated a publishing business under the names Pacifica Press and Pacifica Military History. He died on August 25, 2020, of Parkinson's disease.

Bibliography

 089141441X (v. 2), 0935553142 (v. 3), 0935553282 (v. 5)
 0935553142 (v. 2)

 (pbk.)

 (hbk.)
 (hardbound w/ jacket)
 (hbk.)

Memberships
Marine Corps Historical Foundation
Marine Corps Combat Correspondents Association
Marine Corps Association
The Chosin Few (honorary founder)
Second Marine Division Association
Guadalcanal Campaign Veterans

Notes

1946 births
2020 deaths
American military historians
Jewish American historians
American male non-fiction writers
LIU Post alumni
Temple University alumni
Writers from Philadelphia
Writers from Salem, Massachusetts
American publishers (people)
Historians from Pennsylvania
Historians from Massachusetts
21st-century American Jews
Central High School (Philadelphia) alumni